Kodimalar is a 1966 Indian Tamil-language drama film written and directed by C. V. Sridhar. The film stars Muthuraman and R. Vijayakumari, with A. V. M. Rajan, Nagesh, M. V. Rajamma and Kanchana in supporting roles. It is a remake of the Bengali film Shyamali (1956), itself based on Debnarayan Gupta's play of the same name. The film was released on 4 March 1966 and failed commercially.

Plot 

Lakshmi, a mute woman, faces numerous troubles with her mother-in-law.

Cast 
Male cast
Muthuraman as Ramu
A. V. M. Rajan as Thambi Durai
Nagesh as Annamalai
Female cast
R. Vijayakumari as Lakshmi
M. V. Rajamma as Ramu's mother
Kanchana as Parvathi

Production 
Although the Bengali film Shyamali (1956), based on Debnarayan Gupta's play of the same name was a failure, C. V. Sridhar still decided to adapt the story in Tamil. The remake, titled Kodimalar, was produced by Sree Productions and directed by Sridhar who also wrote the screenplay. Cinematography was handled by Balu, and editing by N. M. Shankar. Filming was suspended, but resumed in October 1965 after sixth months.

Soundtrack 
The music was composed by M. S. Viswanathan, with lyrics by Kannadasan.

Release and reception 
Kodimalar was released on 4 March 1966, and distributed by Rajshri Productions. On 12 March 1966, The Indian Express wrote, "The main defect with the film is that its characters and incidents are so strikingly similar to those seen in some previous Tamil movies that we do not feel like viewing a new film." Writing for Sport and Pastime, T. M. Ramachandran wrote "The delineation of the story follows the conventional pattern. The direction by Sridhar is uninspiring in the first half of the film, in which they are dull patches though it improves in the second". Kalki said Vijayakumari's performance salvaged the film's flaws. The film was commercially unsuccessful.

References

External links 
 

1960s Tamil-language films
1966 drama films
1966 films
Films about disability in India
Films directed by C. V. Sridhar
Films scored by M. S. Viswanathan
Films with screenplays by C. V. Sridhar
Indian drama films
Indian films based on plays
Tamil remakes of Bengali films